The 1967–68 Indiana Pacers season was Indiana's first season in the ABA and its first as a team.

ABA Draft

Roster

Season standings

Eastern Division

Western Division

Record vs. opponents

Awards, records, and honors

ABA All-Stars
 Roger Brown
 Mel Daniels
 Bob Netolicky

Playoffs
Eastern Division Semifinals

Pacers lose series, 3–0

Team leaders

References

Indiana Pacers seasons
Indiana
Indiana Pacers
Indiana Pacers